The year 2015 is the 4th year in the history of the Glory, an international kickboxing promotion. 2015 starts with Glory 19: Virginia, and ends with Glory 26: Amsterdam. The events were broadcasts through television agreements with Spike TV and other regional channels around the world.

List of events

Glory 19: Virginia

Glory 19: Virginia was a kickboxing event held on February 6, 2015 at the Hampton Coliseum in Hampton, Virginia, USA.

Background
The event was originally announced and scheduled to be held on December 19, 2014. However, in late November 2014, the promotion announced it would be delayed until February 2015.

This event featured world title fight for the Glory Heavyweight Championship of Rico Verhoeven vs. Errol Zimmerman as headliner and middleweight fight of Joe Schilling vs. Robert Thomas as co-headliner. Also this event featured 4-Man Welterweight Contender Tournament to earn a title shot for the Glory Welterweight Championship.

Glory 19 had average of 542,000 and peak of 825,000 viewers on Spike TV.

Results

1 Artur Kyshenko was replaced with Murthel Groenhart, and later Alexander Stetsurenko.

2015 Glory Welterweight Contender Tournament bracket

Glory 20: Dubai

Glory 20: Dubai was a kickboxing event held on April 3, 2015 at the Dubai World Trade Centre in Dubai, UAE.

Background
This event featured two world title fights for the Glory Lightweight Championship of Robin van Roosmalen vs. Andy Ristie as headliner and inaugural Glory Featherweight Championship of Gabriel Varga vs. Mosab Amrani as co-headliner. Also this event featured 4-Man Middleweight Contender Tournament to earn a title shot for the Glory Middleweight Championship.

Glory 20 had average of 359,000 viewers on Spike TV.

Results

1 Andrei Stoica was replaced with Saulo Cavalari.
2 Pat Barry was replaced with Dustin Jacoby.
3 Elias El Rayess was replaced with Max Baumert.

2015 Glory Middleweight Contender Tournament bracket

Glory 21: San Diego

Glory 21: San Diego was a kickboxing event held on May 8, 2015 at the Valley View Casino Center in San Diego, California, USA.

Background
This event featured world title fight for the Glory Middleweight Championship of Artem Levin vs. Simon Marcus as headliner. Also this event featured 4-Man Heavyweight Qualification Tournament which will grant the winner entry into the Glory Heavyweight Contender Tournament to be held later.

Glory 21 had average of 488,000 and peak of 797,000 viewers on Spike TV.

Results

2015 Glory Heavyweight Qualification Tournament bracket

Glory 22: Lille

Glory 22: Lille was a kickboxing event held on June 5, 2015 at the Stade Pierre-Mauroy in Lille, France.

Background
This event featured world title fight for the Glory Heavyweight Championship of Rico Verhoeven vs. Benjamin Adegbuyi as headliner and light heavyweight fight of Zack Mwekassa vs. Carlos Brooks. Also this event featured 4-Man Lightweight Contender Tournament to earn a title shot for the Glory Lightweight Championship.

Glory 22, started airing at 16:00 ET on Friday in the United States, had average of 152,000 on Spike TV.

Results

1 Niclas Larsen was replaced with Crice Boussoukou, and later Djimè Coulibaly.
2 Freddy Kemayo was replaced with Mamoudou Keta.
3 Karim Ghajji was replaced with Cédric Doumbé.
4 Djimè Coulibaly was replaced with Serhiy Adamchuk.

2015 Glory Lightweight Contender Tournament bracket

Glory 23: Las Vegas

Glory 23: Las Vegas was a kickboxing event held on August 7, 2015 at the Hard Rock Hotel and Casino in Las Vegas, Nevada, USA.

Background
This event featured world title fight for the vacant Glory Welterweight Championship of Nieky Holzken vs. Raymond Daniels as headliner. Also this event featured 4-Man Middleweight Qualification Tournament for a chance to win a spot in the Glory Middleweight Contender Tournament to be held later.

Glory 23 had average of 295,000 viewers on Spike TV.

Results

2015 Glory Middleweight Qualification Tournament bracket

Bellator/Glory: Dynamite 1

Results

Glory 24: Denver

Glory 24: Denver was a kickboxing event held on October 9, 2015 at the Magness Arena in Denver, Colorado, USA.

Background
This event featured a fight between Joe Schilling and Jason Wilnis as headliner with the winner expected to get a title shot against Glory Middleweight Champion Artem Levin.

This event also featured a 4-Man Heavyweight Contender Tournament to earn a shot at the Glory Heavyweight Championship.

This was the last GLORY event that aired on Spike and marked the end of the 2-year agreement with Spike.

Results

2015 Glory Heavyweight Contender Tournament bracket

Glory 25: Milan

Glory 25: Milan was a kickboxing event held on November 6, 2015 at the PalaIper in Milan, Italy.

Background
This event featured a title fight for the Glory Lightweight Championship between Robin van Roosmalen and Sitthichai Sitsongpeenong as headliner, a fight between Giorgio Petrosyan and Josh Jauncey as co-headliner, and a title fight for the Glory Featherweight Championship between Gabriel Varga and Serhiy Adamchuk in superfight series.

This event also featured a 4-Man Welterweight Contender Tournament to earn a shot at the Glory Welterweight Championship.

Results

2015 Glory Welterweight Contender Tournament bracket

International broadcasting

Glory 26: Amsterdam

Glory 26: Amsterdam was a kickboxing event held on December 4, 2015 at the Amsterdam RAI in Amsterdam, Netherlands.

Background
This event featured a two title fights for the Glory Welterweight Championship between Nieky Holzken and Murthel Groenhart as headliner, and for the Glory Heavyweight Championship between Rico Verhoeven and Benjamin Adegbuyi as co-headliner.

This event also featured a 4-Man Featherweight Contender Tournament to earn a shot at the Glory Featherweight Championship.

Results

2015 Glory Featherweight Contender Tournament bracket

See also
2015 in K-1
2015 in Kunlun Fight

References

Glory (kickboxing) events
2015 in kickboxing